Phalacrachena is a genus of Eurasian plants in the tribe Cardueae within the family Asteraceae.

 Species
 Phalacrachena calva (Ledeb.) Iljin - Altay, Kazakhstan, Uzbekistan, Mongolia
 Phalacrachena inuloides (Fisch.) Iljin - European Russia, Baltic States, Ukraine, Caucasus

References

Asteraceae genera
Cynareae